Mario Tolkmitt (born 30 October 1970) is a German former professional footballer who played as a midfielder.

Tolkmitt made his first appearance with the first team of BFC Dynamo, then nown as FC Berlin, away against HFC Chemie on the 18th matchday of the 1989-90 DDR-Oberliga on 24 Match 1990. He finished the season playing for BSG Bergmann-Borsig Berlin in the second tier DDR-Liga Staffeln A. BSG Bergmann-Borsig Berlin was affiliated to FC Berlin, and effectively functioned as a reserve team for FC Berlin at the time. 

Tolkmitt was listed in the squad of the first team of FC Berlin at the beginning of the 1990-91 season, but was transferred on loan to SG Bermann-Borsig during the autumn of 1990. He returned to FC Berlin for the 1991-92 season. Tolkmitt would then be a regular player for FC Berlin in the 1991-92 NOFV-Oberliga. Tolkmitt was then signed by Bayer Leverkusen for the 1992-92 season.

References

1970 births
Living people
German footballers
Association football midfielders
Berliner FC Dynamo players
SG Bergmann-Borsig players
Bayer 04 Leverkusen players
Fortuna Düsseldorf players
DDR-Oberliga players
Bundesliga players
2. Bundesliga players